Atul Bora is a Bharatiya Janata Party politician from Assam. He has been elected in Assam Legislative Assembly election in 1985 to 1996 and in 2016 from Dispur. He was founding member of Asom Gana Parishad. He joined Bharatiya Janata Party in 2013. He was also minister in Prafulla Kumar Mahanta government.

References 

Living people
Bharatiya Janata Party politicians from Assam
Assam MLAs 2016–2021
Asom Gana Parishad politicians
1949 births
Assam MLAs 2021–2026